Conway's LUX method for magic squares is an algorithm by John Horton Conway for creating magic squares of order 4n+2, where n is a natural number.

Method
Start by creating a (2n+1)-by-(2n+1) square array consisting of 
 n+1 rows of Ls,
 1 row of Us, and
 n-1 rows of Xs,
and then exchange the U in the middle with the L above it.

Each letter represents a 2x2 block of numbers in the finished square.

Now replace each letter by four consecutive numbers, starting with 1, 2, 3, 4 in the centre square of the top row, and moving from block to block in the manner of the Siamese method: move up and right, wrapping around the edges, and move down whenever you are obstructed. Fill each 2x2 block according to the order prescribed by the letter:

Example
Let n = 2, so that the array is 5x5 and the final square is 10x10.
{| class="wikitable" style="text-align: center"
|L||L||L||L||L
|-
|L||L||L||L||L
|-
|L||L||U||L||L
|-
|U||U||L||U||U
|-
|X||X||X||X||X
|}

Start with the L in the middle of the top row, move to the 4th X in the bottom row, then to the U at the end of the 4th row, then the L at the beginning of the 3rd row, etc.

{| class="wikitable" style="text-align: center"
| width="10%" | 68 
| width="10%" | 65 
| width="10%" | 96 
| width="10%" | 93 
| width="10%" |  4 
| width="10%" |  1 
| width="10%" | 32 
| width="10%" | 29 
| width="10%" | 60 
| width="10%" | 57
|-
| 66 || 67 || 94 || 95 ||  2 ||  3 || 30 || 31 || 58 || 59
|-
| 92 || 89 || 20 || 17 || 28 || 25 || 56 || 53 || 64 || 61
|-
| 90 || 91 || 18 || 19 || 26 || 27 || 54 || 55 || 62 || 63
|-
| 16 || 13 || 24 || 21 || 49 || 52 || 80 || 77 || 88 || 85
|-
| 14 || 15 || 22 || 23 || 50 || 51 || 78 || 79 || 86 || 87
|-
| 37 || 40 || 45 || 48 || 76 || 73 || 81 || 84 ||  9 || 12
|-
| 38 || 39 || 46 || 47 || 74 || 75 || 82 || 83 || 10 || 11
|-
| 41 || 44 || 69 || 72 || 97 ||100 ||  5 ||  8 || 33 || 36
|-
| 43 || 42 || 71 || 70 || 99 || 98 ||  7 ||  6 || 35 || 34
|}

See also
Siamese method
Strachey method for magic squares

References
.

Magic squares